Nick Johnson (born ) is an English former rugby league footballer who played in the 2010s.

He made his first team début for the Hull Kingston Rovers on 8 September 2012 away to London Broncos.

References

1990 births
Living people
English rugby league players
Hull Kingston Rovers players
Newcastle Thunder players
Redcliffe Dolphins players
Rugby league centres
Rugby league wingers
Rugby league players from Kingston upon Hull